Berengar is a masculine name derived from Germanic roots meaning "bear" and "spear". The name appears frequently among certain noble families during the Middle Ages, especially the Unruochings and those related. Bérenger is the French form, while Berengario is the Italian form, Berenguer is the Catalan form, and Berenguier or Berengier is the Occitan form. The Latin form is Berengarius and the female equivalent is Berengaria. Other forms of the name include Berenger, Bérenger, Bérangier, or Beringer.

Personal name 

Berengar of Toulouse, Frankish nobleman (fl. ninth century)
Berengar I of Neustria, Frankish nobleman (fl. ninth century)
Berengar II of Neustria, Frankish nobleman (d. 896)
Berengar I of Italy, King of Italy (c. 845–924)
Berengar II of Italy, King of Italy (c. 900–966)
Judicael Berengar, Breton nobleman (fl. tenth century)
Berengar of Tours, theologian (c. 999–1088)
Berengar, Bishop of Venosa (fl. eleventh century)
Henry Berengar, junior co-King of Germany, sometimes numbered as Henry VI (1136/7–1150)
Berenguier de Palazol,  Catalan troubadour (fl. 1160–1209)
Berengier Trobel, Occitan troubadour (fl. thirteenth century)
Berenguer de Palou II, bishop of Barcelona (d. 1241)
Berenguer d'Anoia, Catalan troubadour (fl. fourteenth century)
Berenger Fredoli, French bishop (c. 1250–1323)
Bérenger Saunière, French priest (1852–1917)

As a compound personal name

Ramon Berenguer (disambiguation), multiple people
Berenguer Ramon (disambiguation), multiple people

Family name 

 Álex Berenguer (born 1995), Spanish footballer
 Alphonse-Marie-Marcellin-Thomas Bérenger (1785–1866), French lawyer
 Florin Berenguer (born 1989), French footballer
 Henry Bérenger, (1867–1952) French senator, 1912–45; ambassador to the United States, 1926–28.
 Dámaso Berenguer (1873–1953), Spanish soldier and politician; 64th Prime Minister of Spain.
 Josep Renau Berenguer (1907–1982), Spanish artist
 Casimiro Berenguer (1909–2000), Puerto Rican Nationalist
 Joanna Bérenger (born 1989), Mauritian entertainer
 Pascal Berenguer (born 1981), French footballer
 Paul Bérenger (born 1945), Mauritian politician
 Tom Berenger (born 1949), American actor

Fictional characters 
 Bérenger, a character in the play Rhinoceros by Eugène Ionesco
 Bearenger, a character in Tails Sky Patrol
 Berengar of Arundel, a character in The Name of the Rose
 Berengar, a character in The Witcher (video game)
 Hugh Berengar, a character in The Cadfael Chronicles

Other uses 

Beringer Vineyards

French-language surnames
Germanic masculine given names
German masculine given names

fr:Berenguer
ja:ベレンガーリオ